Peru sent a delegation to compete at the 1976 Summer Paralympics in Toronto, Canada. Its athletes finished twenty-ninth in the overall medal count.

See also 
 1976 Summer Paralympics
 Peru at the 1976 Summer Olympics

References 

Nations at the 1976 Summer Paralympics
1976
Summer Paralympics